The Bayer designation Omicron Canis Majoris (ο CMa / ο Canis Majoris) is shared by two stars, in the constellation Canis Major:
ο¹ Canis Majoris
ο² Canis Majoris
They are separated by 2.06° on the sky.

ο¹ Canis Majoris was member of asterism 軍市 (Jūn Shì), Market for Soldiers, Well mansion. ο² Canis Majoris was not any member of asterism.

References

Canis Major
Canis Majoris, Omicron